The Styx River runs along the northern boundary of Christchurch, New Zealand before flowing into the Waimakariri River close to its mouth via Brooklands Lagoon. This River catchment has its own website.

Course
The river originates in the Christchurch suburb of Harewood, where the dry swale is intermittently filled with stormwater. Along its north-east direction, several springs feed the river. The Styx River has two main tributaries, these are the Kaputone Stream and Smacks Creek. Several other smaller waterways, both natural and man-made, drain into the Styx River, which flows through Belfast, Marshland and Spencerville before it reaches Brooklands where it flows into the Brooklands Lagoon and from there into the Waimakariri River. The Waimakariri River flows into Pegasus Bay.

Naming
The Māori name for the Styx River is Puharakekenui.

There are three misconceived versions of how the Styx received its Pākehā name, and they illustrate that early European settlers travelled through this swampy wetland. According to the first version, European settlers crossed the river on flax-stick rafts; hence the name ‘Sticks’. According to the second version, the bundles of flax sticks were laid in the bed of the river. The third version suggests that the name was derived from the use of flax sticks stuck in the ground to guide travellers to where the river was bridged by logs. In all cases, the spelling of the name ‘Sticks’ was later changed. The name Styx first appeared in the Electoral Rolls in the 1865–66 Register.

However the title Styx derives that of the mythical river by the same name which served as a boundary between the earth and hell. It also denotes a relation to the story of the mythical river in the allegorical tale of "Inferno", a famous work by medieval poet Dante, as English settlers in the area may have made an instigated the experience of crossing the river could have been metaphorically similar to that of entering hell. The name's true origin is something that is lost in translation as it believed to be racist against natives of the area in which the European had begun settling, however it is undeniable that Styx, with such an obscure spelling could not have derived "Sticks" but can only have come from the only other origin, that being the mythological river.

Styx Vision 2000–2040
This river is situated in an area experiencing rapid urban development. A 40-year vision for the catchment was developed in the late 1990s, which was based on concerns and opportunities associated with the Styx ecosystem. After much consultation with the community the Christchurch City Council adopted the "Styx Vision 2000–2040" at its meeting on 11 July 2001.

The Styx Vision 2000–2040 is:
 Vision 1 – To achieve a "Viable Springfed River Ecosystem" to complement the other representative protected ecosystems of Christchurch such as the Port Hills, Travis Wetlands and the Coastline.
 Vision 2 – To create a "Source to Sea Experience" through the development of an Urban National Reserve.
 Vision 3 – To develop a "Living Laboratory" that focuses on both learning and research as practised by botanist Leonard Cockayne (1885–1934).
 Vision 4 – To establish "The Styx" as a place to be through maintaining and enhancing the special character and identity of the area.
 Vision 5 – To foster "Partnerships" through raising the quality of relationships as we move forward together.

These visions set the key directions for future actions, as well as guiding implementation. Christchurch City Council has since acquired large areas of land alongside waterways in the Styx catchment, which will eventually form an ecological network.

References and notes

Rivers of Canterbury, New Zealand
Rivers of Christchurch
Rivers of New Zealand